The Grand Mesa National Scenic Byway is a  National Scenic Byway, National Forest Scenic Byway, and Colorado Scenic and Historic Byway located in Delta and Mesa counties, Colorado, USA. The byway comprises Colorado State Highway 65 from Cedaredge to Interstate 70 Exit 49 and Forest Service Road 100 to the Land's End Observatory.

Route

Gallery

See also

History Colorado
List of scenic byways in Colorado
Scenic byways in the United States

Notes

References

External links

America's Byways
America's Scenic Byways: Colorado
Colorado Department of Transportation
Colorado Scenic & Historic Byways Commission
Colorado Scenic & Historic Byways
Colorado Travel Map
Colorado Tourism Office
History Colorado
National Forest Scenic Byways

Colorado Scenic and Historic Byways
National Scenic Byways
National Scenic Byways in Colorado
National Forest Scenic Byways
National Forest Scenic Byways in Colorado
Grand Mesa National Forest
Transportation in Colorado
Transportation in Delta County, Colorado
Transportation in Mesa County, Colorado
Tourist attractions in Colorado
Tourist attractions in Delta County, Colorado
Tourist attractions in Mesa County, Colorado
Interstate 70